NGC 6751, also known as the Glowing Eye Nebula or the Dandelion Puffball Nebula, is a planetary nebula in the constellation Aquila. It is estimated to be about 6,500 light-years (2.0 kiloparsecs) away.

NGC 6751 was discovered by the astronomer Albert Marth on 20 July 1863. John Louis Emil Dreyer, the compiler of the New General Catalogue, described the object as "pretty bright, small". The object was assigned a duplicate designation, NGC 6748.

The nebula was the subject of the winning picture in the 2009 Gemini School Astronomy Contest, in which Australian high school students competed to select an astronomical target to be imaged by Gemini.

NGC 6751 is an easy telescopic target for deep-sky observers because its location is immediately southeast of the extremely red-colored cool carbon star V Aquilae.

Properties
NGC 6751, like all planetary nebulae was formed when a dying star threw off its outer layers of gas several thousand years ago. It is estimated to be around 0.8 light-years in diameter.

NGC 6751 has a complex bipolar structure. There is a bright, inner bubble (shown in the photo), as well as two fainter halos. (The outer halo, with a radius of 50″ is extremely faint and is broken, while the inner halo with a radius of 27″ is roughly spherical). On both the west and east sides of the inner shell, knots can be seen that are surrounded by faint “lobes”. These lobes are actually a ring, and the eastern side is nearer than the western side. As a whole, the system is approaching the Solar System with a heliocentric radial velocity of −31.7 km/s.

See also
 List of planetary nebulae

References

External links
 
 
 NGC 6751 seds.org
 

Planetary nebulae
6751
Aquila (constellation)
177656